Mukhaputa is a 2009 Indian Kannada-language film written, directed by and starring Roopa Iyer. The film has international HIV/AIDS researchers and academicians as advisors: Dr. Satish, President of HIV Research Association of India, and Prof. Narayan Hosmane, two times Humboldt Award winner of Northern Illinois University, to help authenticate the symptoms, diagnosis, and treatment and to dispel the misconceived notions of the terminal disease. The movie, which is produced by Narayan Hosmane, a cancer specialist in the US, his brother, Subraya Hosmane, an industrialist in Mumbai, and Roopa, also stars Sanya Iyer, Ananda Theertha, Sumithra, Chi. Gurudutt, and Badri Prasad in leading roles. Composer Hamsalekha, who has scored music for the film, too makes a special appearance in the film. An award-winning cinematographer, S. Ramachandra, is the director behind camera, and Haridas is the film editor of the movie, 
Shooting schedules, Marketing, Distribution prepared by Media Networks G.

Plot
The film is about the children suffering from HIV/AIDS.
The film is set in a small town in South India, where a socially responsible educationally oriented traditional woman adopts a young baby girl, and realizes after several years that the child had HIV at birth. The story centered on the child, and a few of her underprivileged friends of the same age, depicts the challenges faced by the girl, her family and the society – it showcases pre-conceived notions that society infers on patients with HIV, and how children and their family are coping up with life. With very positive messages, the film reinforces the strength needed to "grow against all odds" – the message is applicable to all around the world that are struggling to grow in a biased society for no fault of theirs’

Cast 
 Sanya Iyer as Bhavathi
 Roopa Iyer as Gowri
 Ananda Theertha
 Sumithra
 Chi. Guru Dutt
 Badri Prasad
 Narayan Hosmane
 Hamsalekha in a cameo appearance

Reception

Critical response 

BSS from Deccan Herald wrote "First-time director Roopa Iyer weaves a fine, yet robust yarn in the colours of culture, humanity and compassion. Her approach is direct: the supporting characters are forced to look at themselves in their roles as upholders of norms and tradition. Highlighting Hindu culture, Roopa brings in the Vedas, Upanishads and the like dissecting the Hindu way of life effortlessly. However, the film embraces words in place of silence, undoing all the good work"  A critic from Bangalore Mirror wrote  "The film has a few touching scenes. But due to the preachy nature of Roopa Iyer’s character and the more-than-necessary focus on her alone, the film loses some of its serious tone.Sania Iyer as the HIV infected child touches a raw nerve. Hamsalekha’s music and S Ramachandra’s camera work are okay but not remarkable".

Awards

References

External links 
Mukhaputa for Cairo Film Festival
Kannada film wins award in Ireland
Kannada film 'Mukhaputa' wins top honours at Ireland film fest

Medical-themed films
HIV/AIDS in Indian films
Films scored by Hamsalekha
2000s Kannada-language films